Chelsey Heijnen (born 2 May 1999) is a Dutch amateur boxer who won a bronze medal at the 2022 World Championships.

Biograhpy
Heijnen started with playing rugby. She was given the advice to improve her footwork through boxing, and she continued with boxing. As a junior, Heijnen became European champion in Sofia 2017. In 2019 she won the silver medal at the Strandja Cup in the 64 kg category. Heijnen was nominated to become 2019 Roosendaal sportswomen of the year. In March 2020, Heijnen was not able to qualify for the 2020 Summer Olympics at the 2020 European Boxing Olympic Qualification Tournament. She competeted at the 2022 IBA Women's World Boxing Championships in the light welterweight category and won the bronze medal. She was the only Dutch competitor at these 2022 World Championships.

She was trained (in 2019) by André de Klerk and coached by Abdul Fkiri.

Heijnen studied at the Johan Cruyff College where she earned a spot in the "Wall of Fame" in May 2019 and received her diploma in July 2019.

References

External links
 Profile at boxrec.com
 Profile at TeamNL

Dutch women boxers
21st-century Dutch women
Sportspeople from Roosendaal

1999 births
Living people